HMAS Goolgwai was an auxiliary minesweeper operated by the Royal Australian Navy (RAN) during World War II. She was launched in 1919 by Collingwood Shipbuilding Company at Collingwood, Ontario, Canada as Almeria. The ship operated in Australian waters from 1928, and was requisitioned by the RAN on 3 September 1939. She was returned to her owners in 1945 before being wrecked near Malabar, Sydney, on 29 May 1955.

Operational history
Commissioned by the Admiralty near the end of World War I, she was laid down at the Kingston Shipyards in 1918 and completed by the Collingwood Shipbuilding Company, where she was launched in 1918.

Goolgwai was purchased by the Red Funnell Trawler Pty Ltd and sailed from Fleetwood, England to Sydney, Australia in 1928. On 3 September 1939, Goolgwai was requisitioned by the RAN for use as an auxiliary and commissioned on 6 October 1939.

During the war, Goolgwai was based initially in Sydney with Minesweeping Group 50 and operated along the New South Wales coastline before later operating in the Cape York/Thursday Island region. She was returned to her owners in November 1945.

On 29 May 1955, Goolgwai was wrecked after hitting rocks near Malabar, Sydney.

Citations

References
 http://www.navyhistory.org.au/?s=goolgwai
 http://www.michaelmcfadyenscuba.info/viewpage.php?page_id=63
 https://web.archive.org/web/20100811153006/http://www.randwick.nsw.gov.au/About_Randwick/Heritage/Shipwrecks/SS_Goolgwai/index.aspx

1918 ships
1955 in Australia
Fishing ships of Australia
Maritime incidents in 1955
Minesweepers of the Royal Australian Navy
Ships built in Collingwood, Ontario
Shipwrecks of the Sydney Eastern Suburbs Region